HW2 may refer to:

Homeworld 2, a 2003 video game
Halo Wars 2, a 2017 video game